Puthige is a small village with its own panchayath administration, located in Kasaragod district of Kerala, India.

Languages
This locality is an essentially multi-lingual region. The people speak Malayalam, Kannada, Tulu, Beary bashe and Konkani. Migrant workers also speak Hindi and Tamil languages.

Administration
This village is part of Manjeswaram assembly constituency which is again part of Kasaragod (Lok Sabha constituency)

Constituent villages
The following 14 wards are the constituent villages of the Puthige Panchayath administration system. 
 Chennikodi
 Dharmathadka
 Deradka
 Badoor
 Mugu
 Urmi
 Ujampadavu
 Seethangoli
 Kannur-puthige
 Edanad
 Mukarikanda
 Puthige
 Kathib nagar
 Angadimogar

See also
 Kattathadka
 Seethangoli

References

Manjeshwar area